Steven Donald Dalachinsky (September 29, 1946 – September 16, 2019) was an American downtown New York City poet, active in the music, art, and free jazz scenes. He wrote poetry for most of his life and read frequently at Michael Dorf's club the Knitting Factory, the Poetry Project and the Vision Festival, an Avant-jazz festival held annually on the Lower East Side of New York City. Dalachinsky also read his works in Japan, France and Germany. He collaborated with many musicians, writing liner notes for artists: William Parker, Susie Ibarra, Matthew Shipp, Joe McPhee, Nicola Hein, Dave Liebman, Roy Campbell, Daniel Carter, Joëlle Léandre, Kommissar Hjuler, Thurston Moore, Sabir Mateen, Jim O'Rourke, and Mat Maneri

Dalachinsky authored numerous books including a compendium of poetry written while listening to saxophonist Charles Gayle perform throughout New York City, and a collection of poems which focused on his time as a superintendent at an apartment building in Soho. Along with pianist Matthew Shipp, he co-authored the book Logos and Language: A Post-Jazz Metaphorical Dialogue and collaborated with French photographer Jacques Bisceglia on Reaching Into The Unknown. His spoken word albums include Incomplete Directions and a collaboration with Shipp on the album Phenomena of Interference. Dalachinsky's works also appeared in several journals and anthologies as well.

He received the Franz Kafka Prize, Acker Award, PEN Oakland/Josephine Miles Literary Award and was nominated for a 2015 Pushcart Prize. He lived in Manhattan with his wife, painter and poet Yuko Otomo.

Early life

Dalachinsky was born in 1946, Brooklyn, New York, "right after the last big war and has managed to survive lots of little wars", which is how he is frequently described. He grew up in the Midwood section of the borough that was mostly an Italian and Jewish neighborhood with parents that were working class. Dalachinsky said he was "always writing" at an early age and was also "involved in art". His earliest notebooks of his writings that have survived go back to when he was between the ages of 13 and 15. He was once kicked out of a Hebrew school because he was "wearing a cross", and hung out with the Italian kids in the neighborhood which "framed his perception of being Jewish", according to him.

Dalachinsky started taking art lessons at the Pratt Institute where for 18 months he first attempted his hand at painting, eventually turning to writing poetry full-time. It was during this period in his life when he discovered beat poetry and found the poetry scene in Manhattan. He was given copies of Lawrence Ferlinghetti’s A Coney Island of the Mind and Allen Ginsberg’s Howl, which he says changed his style of writing. Dalachinsky was also influenced by the writings of Franz Kafka, Albert Camus, Ezra Pound, Delmore Schwartz, Federico Garcia Lorca, and William Blake, especially the work Auguries of Innocence by Blake. Besides writers, he counted obsession, socio-political angst, human disappointment, jazz music and abstract visual art among his influences. Dalachinsky related that writing process was as if "spontaneity mixed with a conscious pushing" and a "descriptive transformation". His works have been portrayed as leaning towards "transforming the image rather than merely describing it".

For 19 years, starting in the 1980s, he wrote some of his poems while listening to live jazz music, going to free jazz saxophonist Charles Gayle's performances, creating poems on scraps of paper. In 2006, Dalachinsky published a book of poems devoted entirely to Gayle, with the poems appearing chronologically in the order of the venues where Gayle performed at. The collection was honored in 2007 with a PEN Oakland/Josephine Miles Literary Award. The book is also unusual because not only is it documenting the music, but also Dalachinsky's state of mind at the precise moment of capturing a musical phrase. Sometimes when Gayle's performance came with a sermon or lecture, commenting on topics like abortion or racial separatism, Dalachinsky would react with his poems reflecting the mood:

Dalachinsky also released a collection of poems, titled A Superintendent’s Eyes, which focused on his time as a superintendent at a Spring Street apartment building in Soho. It was published by The Unbearables, whom both him and his wife have a connection with, and describe themselves as a "loose collective of noir humorists, beer mystics, anarchists, neophobes and passionate debunkers". In his 2013 review of the book, Alan Kaufman wrote: "It is the single most important volume of poetry to appear in the last ten years...he is the poet that America has been waiting for to free our national verse from its stratospheric sense of self-importance and return us to a poetry of flesh and heart, song and cement, just as Whitman's Leaves of Grass did in the nineteenth Century". The poems were written over 20 years and described by Kaufman as, "ash can sonatas to lovemaking with wife, eating out in restaurants, illness, cancelled hopes, money worries, cash scores, tenant complaints, landlord humiliations and ruminations on drug addiction". In one poem written while his wife was away in Japan, and he was relocating his writing space, he begins:

In 2018, Dalachinsky released his poetry collection Where Day and Night Become One: The French Poems: 1983-2017, which assembled more than 30 years of writing journals from this trips to Paris. It was published by the New York-based publishing company Great Weather for Media, and was the Silver Award-Winner in the 31st Annual IBPA Benjamin Franklin Awards in Poetry. In his review of the book in Sensitive Skin, Valery Oisteanu wrote: "The free-wheeling Dalachinsky jumps easily from free verse to concrete poetry, from chaotic typography to whimsical designs, word constructions and deconstructions, puns, sound percussion ('tachada, tachada'), plays on names and words à la Duchamp or 'mailtrate de la langue a la Americane'". The poems were written over 34 years and described by Oisteanu as, "a dream-like literary mindscape peppered with head-spinning references, using an erudite knowledge, ostentatious name-dropping and a post-beatnik morphistic narrative of rare synchronicity. A perfect collage of cut-ups; train-of-thought à la Allen Ginsberg; an awkwardly unsettling geography laced with hidden meaning". Addressing a loved one, Dalachinsky writes:

Readings, collaborations and writings

Dalachinsky read throughout the New York City area including at the: Poetry Project, Vision Festival, ISSUE Project Room and the Knitting Factory. and also read in San Francisco. Abroad, he had read his works in Japan, Germany and England, where he read his Insomnia Poems, a collaboration with composer Pete Wyer for BBC Radio 3. In France, Dalachinsky performed extensively. He read in Bordeaux, Sète and in Paris at Les Instants Chavirés and the L'Olympic Café. He read at the Centre international de poésie in Marseille, Maison de la Poésie de Nantes at Pannonica, participated in the Sons d'Hiver Festival and the Val-de Marne International Poetry Festival.

In 2011, he collaborated with French duet art-rockers The Snobs on Massive Liquidity, the first of three records with the band, including the electronic and rock sounding ec(H)o-system in 2015. In 2015, he worked with Alex Lozupone's group, Eighty Pound Pug on a jazz-metal album; and with German visual artist Sig Bang Schmidt on Flying Home In 2017, he collaborated with his wife on two projects, Frozen Heatwave and Black Magic. Dalachinsky penned liner notes for recordings of several musicians: Roscoe Mitchell, Charles Gayle, Anthony Braxton, James Blood Ulmer, Matthew Shipp, Roy Campbell, Assif Tsahar, Derek Bailey and Rashied Ali. Additionally, he collaborated with musicians: William Parker, Susie Ibarra, Matthew Shipp, Roy Campbell, Daniel Carter, Sabir Mateen, Mat Maneri, Federico Ughi, Loren Mazzacane Connors, Rob Brown, Tim Barnes and Jim Rourke.

Other books and chapbooks he wrote include: Quicksand, The Invisible Ray with artwork by Shalom Neuman, Lautreamont's Laments, Dream Book, In Glorious Black and White, St. Lucie, Are We Not MEN & Fake Book,  Trial and Error in Paris and Where Night and Day Become One, from his trips to Paris. His spoken word albums include Incomplete Directions, Phenomena of Interference with Matthew Shipp and I thought it was the end of the world then the end of the world happened again with Federico Ughi.

In 2015, he released a heavy metal album, Leave The Door Open. Culture Catch stated "Dalachinsky's self-deprecating Brooklyn humor and existentialist beat musings, more usually accompanied by free jazz, prove highly compatible with this doomier sound keyed on Lozupone's electronically combined bass and guitar. Really, what better to accompany a 9/11 poem that starts, 'I thought it was the end of the world/And then the end of the world happened again'?"

In 2019, Steve Dalachinsky released his third and last collaboration with The Snobs, Pretty in the Morning, on french label Bisou Records. The album was recorded live at Espace En Cours in Paris in october 2017 with an extended line-up of the band to accompany his voice: Duck Feeling (guitar, Mellotron, synthesizer, drum machine), Mad Rabbit (bass, sampler), Devil Sister (theremin, trumpet, xaphoon), Fuzzy Weasel (guitar, effects).

Anthologies
His poems are included in the anthologies:

Journals
His works have appeared in the journals:

Death
Dalachinsky died of a stroke on September 16, 2019 at a hospital in Long Island, New York at the age of 72, thirteen days before his 73rd birthday.

Books dedicated to jazz

Avant-garde jazz has been a major inspiration for his writing, with five books of his poems dedicated solely to jazz musicians. All of them being written while listening to the music live. 
The Final Nite: Complete Notes from a Charles Gayle Notebook - written over 20 years of listening to saxophonist Charles Gayle.
Logos and Language: A Post-Jazz Metaphorical Dialogue - a collaboration with pianist Matthew Shipp.
The Mantis, - a chapbook for pianist Cecil Taylor covering 50 years, the first written when he was 19.
Reaching Into The Unknown - collaboration with photographer Jacques Bisceglia written from 1967 through 2011.
Long Play E.P. - a small chapbook for saxophonist Evan Parker.

Discography
Electronic, experimental, spoken word, abstract and poetry albums (including collaborations):
Incomplete Directions
I Thought It Was The End Of The World Then The End Of The World Happened Again
Phenomena of Interference
Thin Air 
Merci Pour le Visite
Massive Liquidity (with The Snobs)
The Bill Has Been Paid
The Fallout Of Dreams
ec(H)o - system (with The Snobs)
Leave the Door Open
Pray For Me
Insomnia Poems
Fluxporn/the NO!art Statements (w/Boris Lurie & Dietmar Kirves, Kommissar Hjuler, Mama Baer)
Fluxus (w/Kommissar Hjuler)
Genconhjulachinsky (w/Conrad Schnitzler & Gen Ken Montgomery, Mama Baer)
Justifiable Homicide 
Gotta Keep Moving (Steve Dalachinsky &   Albey Balgochian >) 
Pretty in the Morning (with The Snobs)

See also
Beat Scene
Leonard Cohen, Canadian Beat Generation poet & songwriter
Literary Kicks
European free jazz
Bibliography of jazz
List of jazz musicians

Notes

References

Sources

External links

The Poetry Center Reading Room at San Francisco State University

Steve Dalachinsky at ISSUE Project Room

American male poets
20th-century American poets
1946 births
2019 deaths
PEN Oakland/Josephine Miles Literary Award winners
Beat Generation poets
Chevaliers of the Ordre des Arts et des Lettres
Chapbook writers
American spoken word artists
Free jazz
21st-century American poets
20th-century American male writers
21st-century American male writers
Poets from New York (state)
Writers from Brooklyn
Knitting Factory Records artists